Joe Williams (born July 22, 1985) is an American mixed martial artist who competes in Bellator's welterweight division.

Background
Williams has an extensive background in wrestling. He started to train when he was eight years old and during his juvenility he earned many state and national titles along with many other honors.

Mixed martial arts career

Early career
Williams started his professional career in 2011. He fought mainly for California-based promotion Respect in the Cage.

With a record of 7–0 and victories over Strikeforce veteran Eddie Mendez and WEC veteran Fernando Gonzalez, he signed with Bellator.

Bellator MMA
Williams made his debut on August 24, 2012 at Bellator 73 against fellow newcomer Andy Uhrich. Williams had his first defeat via unanimous decision (30-27, 29-28, 29-28).

Williams faced Rod Montoya on October 5, 2012 at Bellator 75. He won via submission in the very first round.

Williams faced UFC veteran Jamie Yager on January 17, 2013 at Bellator 85. He won via TKO in the first round.

Fight Master: Bellator MMA
On May 6, 2013, it was announced that Williams would be featured as a participant on Bellator MMA reality TV show Fight Master. In the second episode, Joe lost in the entry round via unanimous decision against Cole Williams.

Williams received another chance after the medical suspension of Andy Uhrich due to a cut over his eye during his fight against Dom O'Grady in the entry round. Frank Shamrock picked Williams to fill the last spot of the team. In the fifth episode, Williams is shown facing Ismael Gonzalez in the round of 16 of the tournament. He completely dominated Gonzalez on the ground in round one and finished the fight via submission due to an arm-triangle choke in round two.  In the quarterfinals, Williams faced Eric Bradley and lost via majority decision after two rounds.

Post Fight Master
Williams faced Jesse Juarez on November 2, 2013 at Bellator 106. He lost via submission due to a guillotine choke early in the first round.

Championships and accomplishments

Mixed Martial Arts
Respect in the Cage
RITC middleweight title (one time)
Three successful title defenses

Adult Citrus Industry
 Recipient of "Golden Grapefruit" award

Mixed martial arts record

|-
| Loss
| align=center| 9–2
| Jesse Juarez
| Submission (guillotine choke)
| Bellator 106
| 
| align=center| 1
| align=center| 0:57
| Long Beach, California, United States
| 
|-
| Win
| align=center| 9–1
| Jamie Yager
| TKO (punches)
| Bellator 85
| 
| align=center| 1
| align=center| 4:02
| Irvine, California, United States
| 
|-
| Win
| align=center| 8–1
| Rod Montoya
| Submission (rear-naked choke)
| Bellator 75
| 
| align=center| 1
| align=center| 3:17
| Hammond, Indiana, United States
| 
|-
| Loss
| align=center| 7–1
| Andy Uhrich
| Decision (unanimous)
| Bellator 73
| 
| align=center| 3
| align=center| 5:00
| Tunica Resorts, Mississippi, United States
| 
|-
| Win
| align=center| 7–0
| Vince Alaalatoa
| Submission (arm-triangle choke)
| RITC - Respect in the Cage
| 
| align=center| 3
| align=center| 2:58
| Pomona, California, United States
| Defended RITC middleweight title
|-
| Win
| align=center| 6–0
| Ben Martin
| KO (punch)
| RITC - Respect in the Cage
| 
| align=center| 1
| align=center| 3:55
| Pomona, California, United States
| Defended RITC middleweight title
|-
| Win
| align=center| 5–0
| Fernando Gonzalez
| Decision (split)
| RITC - Respect in the Cage
| 
| align=center| 5
| align=center| 5:00
| Pomona, California, United States
| Defended RITC middleweight title
|-
| Win
| align=center| 4–0
| Eddie Mendez
| Decision (unanimous)
| RITC - Respect in the Cage
| 
| align=center| 5
| align=center| 5:00
| Pomona, California, United States
| Won RITC middleweight title
|-
| Win
| align=center| 3–0
| Tony Gianopoulos Jr.
| TKO (punches)
| RITC - Respect in the Cage
| 
| align=center| 1
| align=center| 2:57
| Pomona, California, United States
| 
|-
| Win
| align=center| 2–0
| Daniel Mancha
| TKO (punches)
| KOTC: Empire
| 
| align=center| 2
| align=center| 2:06
| San Bernardino, California, United States
| 
|-
| Win
| align=center| 1–0
| Tony Dalton
| Submission (rear-naked choke)
| RITC - Respect in the Cage
| 
| align=center| 3
| align=center| 2:59
| Pomona, California, United States
|

References

1985 births
Living people
Sportspeople from Orange, California
American male sport wrestlers
American Muay Thai practitioners
American male mixed martial artists
Welterweight mixed martial artists
Mixed martial artists utilizing wrestling
Mixed martial artists utilizing Muay Thai
Mixed martial artists from California